The Quaternary is a geologic period.

Quaternary (an adjective meaning "fourth in order" or "composed of four items") may also refer to:
 Quaternary (chemistry) (see also Quaternary compound and Quaternary phase)
 Quaternary structure of proteins
 Quaternary sector of the economy, which encompasses knowledge-based services
 Quaternary care, health care that includes highly specialized or experimental treatments
 Quaternary numeral system (base-4) in mathematics
 Quaternary counting system, as used in some human languages
 Quaternary (EP), an album by Mötley Crüe

See also
 
 
 Quinary, positional number system with base 5
 Ternary (disambiguation)
 Tertiary (disambiguation)